Clarence Edward Hill (December 2, 1957 – September 20, 2006) was an American convicted murderer executed by the state of Florida.

A native of Mobile, Alabama, Hill was convicted of the October 19, 1982 murder of Pensacola, Florida police officer Stephen Taylor and the wounding of Taylor's partner, Larry Bailly, when both officers responded to a bank alarm.  Hill was sentenced to death by lethal injection.

On January 24, 2006, as his execution was just moments away from commencing—Hill was strapped to a gurney with intravenous lines in his arms—it was stopped by a stay from Justice Anthony Kennedy of the United States Supreme Court. Mr. Hill's lawyer, Todd Doss, had lobbied for the stay on the grounds that the chemicals involved in lethal injection violated Mr. Hill's Eighth Amendment rights, protecting against "cruel and unusual punishment."

On June 12, 2006, Justice Anthony Kennedy authored an opinion for a unanimous court in Hill v. McDonough which gave Hill a temporary reprieve. The Court concluded that Mr. Hill did have the right to make an Eighth Amendment claim against Florida's method of lethal injection, overturning a District Court ruling. The ruling did not declare that the chemical used in lethal injections in Florida was unconstitutional, but it allows inmates to make the claim.

However, a district court in Tallahassee and an appeals court in Atlanta refused to hear Hill's challenges, ruling that he should have filed earlier. An appeal was again filed with the Supreme Court, which voted 5-4 on September 20, 2006 to deny another stay.

Later that day, 24 years after his crime, Hill was executed through lethal injection by the state of Florida, at the Florida State Prison in Raiford, Florida. He did not reply when asked if he had a last statement, staring straight at the ceiling, awaiting start of the lethal injection.

See also
 Capital punishment in Florida
 Capital punishment in the United States
 List of people executed in Florida
 List of people executed in the United States in 2006

References

External links 
Inmate Release Information Detail - Inmate 089718. Florida Department of Corrections. Retrieved on 2007-11-14.

1957 births
2006 deaths
1982 murders in the United States
21st-century executions of American people
21st-century executions by Florida
American bank robbers
American people convicted of attempted murder
American people executed for murdering police officers
Executed African-American people
People convicted of murder by Florida
People executed by Florida by lethal injection
People from Mobile, Alabama
Executed people from Alabama
21st-century African-American people